Bjarne Melgaard (born 9 September 1967) is a Norwegian artist based in New York City. He has been described as "one of Norway's most important artists" and, following the 2014 publicity about his sculpture Chair, "the most famous Norwegian artist since Edvard Munch."

Life and work
Melgaard was born in Sydney, Australia to Norwegian parents, and was raised in Oslo, Norway. In 2009, he moved permanently to New York. Melgaard studied at the Norwegian National Academy of Fine Arts, Rijksakademie in Amsterdam from 1991 to 1992 and at the Jan van Eyck Academie in Maastricht from 1992 to 1993.

Early in his career Melgaard created controversial installations referencing subversive subcultures such as S&M and heavy metal music. Currently, his practice consists of an emphasis on expressionistic paintings and drawings, often containing text.

His first show in New York was in 2000, where he exhibited sculptures of apes engaged in sex acts.

In January 2014, Melgaard's artwork Chair sparked controversy. Chair is a sculpture of a bound black woman on her back with a seat cushion on her thighs, and is a reinterpretation of a similar piece by British pop artist Allen Jones. The controversy began when Russian art socialite Dasha Zhukova was photographed sitting on the cushion for a fashion website, sparking online accusations of racism under the Twitter hashtag #racistchair. Guardian critic Jonathan Jones suggested that this controversy was a misunderstanding of Melgaard's intentions, and Zhukova said that the photograph of her was "out of context"; the artwork intended to be a "commentary on gender and racial politics". Melgaard himself released a statement responding to the controversy that was labelled by some writers as "bizarre".

Melgaard has collaborated with Norwegian artist Sverre Koren Bjertnaes in several exhibitions. The two alternate to work on the same canvas, giving them an expression neither of the artists would achieve alone.

Notable exhibitions

2019

Naturally Naked, Gary Tatintsian Gallery, Moscow 

2013

"Bjarne Melgaard", Astrup Fearnley, Oslo
"Ignorant Transparencies", Gavin Brown’s Enterprise, New York 

2012
"A House to Die In", Institute of Contemporary Arts, London

2008
Bjarne Melgaard, Greene Naftali Gallery, New York

2007
The Glamour Chase, Galleri Faurschou, Copenhagen

2006

Helter Helter, Galerie Anne De Villepoix, Paris
Les Super, Galerie Guido W. Baudach, Berlin
A Weekend of Painting; A novel by Les Super, Galerie Leo Koenig, New York

2005

Jasmine La Nuit, The Horse Hospital, London
Hallo Maybe, Haugar Vestfold Museum, Oslo

2004

Tirol Transfer, Oesterreichisches Kulturforum, Warsaw

2003

Skam, Bergen Kunsthall, Bergen
The End of The Professional Teenager, Sketch, London

2002

Black Low, MARTa Herford Museum, Hannover
Galleria d’Arte Moderna, Bologna

2001

New Heimat, Kunstverein Frankfurt

2000

Sharing Exoticisms, 5th Biennale de Lyon

Melgaard appears in Until the Light Takes Us, a documentary about the Norwegian black metal scene in the 1990s. The film featured in the 15th Athens International Film Festival (16–27 September 2009), screened at Danaos Cinema. In the film, an exhibition of Melgaard's in a Stockholm gallery is extensively shown, along with his comments on black/death metal.

References

External links
Find yourself a different place to die! The debate regarding Ekely: Melgaard wishes to build in Munchs immediate proximity

Living people
1967 births
Artists from Sydney
Gay artists
Norwegian contemporary artists
21st-century LGBT people